Bacillocnemis is a monotypic genus of Argentinian running crab spiders containing the single species, Bacillocnemis anomala. It was first described by Cândido Firmino de Mello-Leitão in 1938, and is only found in Argentina.

See also
 List of Philodromidae species

References

Monotypic Araneomorphae genera
Philodromidae
Spiders of Argentina
Taxa named by Cândido Firmino de Mello-Leitão